Loomis Hammond Taylor (July 30, 1889 – January 1, 1963) was an opera director of the Metropolitan Opera from 1912 to 1915. In 1916 he moved to the Chicago Grand Opera Company for a staging of a Wagner opera. He was then appointed as director of the Cleveland Grand Opera Company.

Biography
He was born on July 30, 1889 in Skaneateles, New York to George Loomis Taylor and Elizabeth Percy Hammond. He moved to Manhattan and was the stage manager of the Metropolitan Opera starting in 1912. He married Henrietta Cowenhoven Brown on April 19, 1913, at St. Mark's Church in-the-Bowery in Manhattan.

In 1916 he moved to the Chicago Grand Opera Company for a staging of Richard Wagner operas. He was then appointed as director of the Cleveland Grand Opera Company.

In 1922 he became a correspondent for the Musical Courier.

Taylor died in Munich, Germany, on 1 January 1963.

References

Further reading
Search "Loomis Taylor", MetOpera Database

1889 births
1963 deaths
People from Skaneateles, New York
Metropolitan Opera people
American opera directors